Nicolae Milinceanu (born 1 August 1992) is a Moldovan professional footballer who plays as a forward for Cypriot club AEL Limassol.

Career
Nicolae Milinceanu started his footballer career at A.S. Monaco, where he played from 2007 until 2011. From there, he moved to Rapid Bucharest until September 2014.

In 2015, Milinceanu transferred to FC Petrolul Ploiesti He debuted for the Moldova national football team that same year.

PAS Giannina
On 15 January 2021, he moved to PAS Giannina in Super League Greece. On 21 January 2021 he made his debut with his new team in Greek Cup against Atromitos F.C. in the season 2020–21 at the Zosimades Stadium, replacing Vladyslav Naumets in the second half. On 3 February 2021 he scored his first goal with the club in Greek Cup for the victory for 2–3 against Atromitos at the Peristeri Stadium, allowing the club to qualify for the next round of 2020–21. On 6 March 2021 he scored his first goal in Super League Greece for the winning goal against Panathinaikos in the season 2020–21.

International goals
Scores and results list Moldova's goal tally first.

Honours
FC Veris
Divizia "A" (1): 2012-2013
Moldovan National Division
Third place (1): 2013-2014

Monaco
France Championship U-17:

Notes

References

External links

1992 births
Living people
Footballers from Chișinău
Moldovan footballers
Association football midfielders
Moldova international footballers
Moldovan expatriate footballers
Moldovan expatriate sportspeople in Romania
Moldovan expatriate sportspeople in Belarus
Moldovan expatriate sportspeople in Malta
Moldovan expatriate sportspeople in Switzerland
Moldovan expatriate sportspeople in Greece
Moldovan expatriate sportspeople in Cyprus
Expatriate footballers in Romania
Expatriate footballers in Belarus
Expatriate footballers in Malta
Expatriate footballers in Switzerland
Expatriate footballers in Greece
Expatriate footballers in Cyprus
Moldovan Super Liga players
Swiss Challenge League players
Liga I players
Maltese Premier League players
Super League Greece players
Cypriot First Division players
FC Veris Chișinău players
FC Rapid București players
FC Petrolul Ploiești players
FC Academia Chișinău players
Speranța Nisporeni players
FC Granit Mikashevichi players
FC Zimbru Chișinău players
Sliema Wanderers F.C. players
FC Chiasso players
FC Vaduz players
Expatriate footballers in Liechtenstein
PAS Giannina F.C. players
AEL Limassol players
Moldovan expatriate sportspeople in Liechtenstein